The Harvey's red duiker (Cephalophus harveyi) is one of 19 species of duiker found in Tanzania and scattered through Kenya, southern Somalia and possibly central Ethiopia.

Harvey's duikers are roughly 40 cm (15 in) tall at the shoulder and weigh around 15 kg (33 lb), on average. They have mostly chestnut coats, but their legs and faces are black.

Harvey's duikers live in mountain and lowland forest, where they eat leaves, twigs, fruit, insects, birds eggs, and carrion.  Although this duiker is not endangered, it is dependent on protected forestland. As of 2008, this species is of least concern.

References

Harvey's duiker
Fauna of East Africa
Mammals of Kenya
Mammals of Tanzania
Harvey's duiker
Harvey's duiker